KCN may refer to:

 The Nubi language of Uganda and Kenya has ISO 639-3 code kcn
 Potassium cyanide has chemical formula KCN
 Kent Community Network, broadband provider